The following article is a '''summary of the 2012–13 soccer season in Australia.

Domestic leagues

A-League

Regular season

Finals

W-League

Regular season

Finals

National Youth League

International club competitions

AFC Champions League

Brisbane Roar
Brisbane Roar qualified for a playoff spot as winners of the 2012 A-League Grand Final.

Central Coast Mariners
Central Coast Mariners entered in the Group stage as 2011–12 A-League Premiers.

International Women's Club Championship
The winners of the 2011-12 season Canberra United participated in the 2012 International Women's Club Championship, known as the Mobcast Cup for sponsorship reasons, the first edition of this tournament hosted by the JFA.

Canberra United finished in fourth place (out of four teams), suffering two losses.

National teams

Men's senior

Friendlies

EAFF East Asian Cup

World Cup qualifying

Men's under-20

Friendlies

AFC U-22 Championship qualification

AFF U-19 Youth Championship

AFC U-19 Championship

FIFA U-20 World Cup

Men's under-17

Friendlies

AFC U-16 Championship

Women's senior

Friendlies

EAFF Women's East Asian Cup

Women's under-20

Friendlies

Women's under-17

Friendlies

AFC U-16 Women's Championship qualification

References

External links
 Football Federation Australia official website

2012–13 in Australian women's soccer
Seasons in Australian soccer